The No. 1 Senior High School of Ürümqi, literally  Ürümqi No. 1 High School, colloquially abbreviated as "" or "", sometimes called No. 1 Middle School of Urumqi, is a public high school in Ürümqi, Xinjiang Uyghur Autonomous Region, China, under the jurisdiction of the Urumqi Municipal Education Bureau. Founded in 1891 during the Qing dynasty, it is the oldest school in Xinjiang.

Located in the downtown Bei Men at Jiankang Road and North Jiefang Road in Tianshan District, Urumqi, the school is the accredited top-ranking high school in Urumqi city and in Xinjiang, and is considered a typical instance of local secondary education. All of the courses are in Chinese. The students are predominantly Han Chinese, with other ethnic groups including Hui, Uyghur, Kazakh, Mongol, etc.

Starting from August, 2017, the school begin using the new campus located in the Xi'er Street(西二巷) of Kanasihubei Road(喀纳斯湖北路). With an investment of more than 551 million yuan, the new campus covers an area of 14.5547 hectares and contains two Teaching Buildings, two Science Buildings(with three floors of Library), one Office Building, one Art Building, one Astronomy-Music Integrated Building, one Stadium, three Dormitory Buildings, one Standard Soccer Field, and one Dining Hall Building.

History

The institutional predecessor, known as Bo Da Academy of Sinkiang(lit. Sinkiang Academy of Erudition), was founded on August 14, 1891, by the then Qing dynasty, when it was 20 years before the establishment of the Republic of China.In the early ROC period, many well-educated Chinese intellectuals and political figures, converged on the school to pursue their studies in Xinjiang. The former school president Yu Xiusong (in office in 1936), came around and taught in the school as the then leader of the CPC Shanghai Leading Group and one of the founding members of the Communist Youth League of China (CYLC). In 1938, Li Yunyang, one of the CPC members dispatched by the Central Politburo, became president of the school. Other major figures, such as the revolutionary martyr Lin Jilu, along with Shen Yanbing (writer), Zhao Dan (artist), have lectured in the school. These people who had intensive revolutionary backgrounds affected the students deeply in their minds, bringing in Marxist ideology. During the Second Sino-Japanese War, some of them also contrived to enlighten the students and the young generation and propagandized ideological guidance in an effort to help the country. Their efforts contributed to the peaceful liberation of Xinjiang and created a hopeful atmosphere among the youths.   

By 1953, the State Education Commission labelled the school as the sole key middle school in Xinjiang. However, the Cultural Revolution inflicted heavy losses upon it; almost all stored books in its library totaling approximately 40,000 were rifled during that time. With the resumption of the National College Entrance Examination (NCEE, or CEE) in the late 1970s right after the Cultural Revolution, the school had been achieving progressive success in CEE results of the students. In 1982, it was labelled once more in the first list of the country's best-run key schools. Since 1995, the school has permanently ranked at the top places by CEE evaluation. Through the public assessment, it was chosen as a city-level unit of spiritual civilization in the year 1995, and sequentially as the autonomous region-level one in the end of the same year. Over the nearest past four years, the school's rate of matriculation (ROM) to college reached over 99% steadily. The high school consolidated its top rank in Xinjiang high schools exposed by the CEE result.

In 2004, a civil North School of the No. 1 Senior High School of Urumqi was founded by the school authorities and their collaborative company known as Xinjiang Jun Fa Industrial & Investment Co. Ltd.

Starting from August, 2017, the school begin using the new campus located in the Xi'er Street(西二巷) of Kanasihubei Road(喀纳斯湖北路).

Facilities 

*The school is currently composed of the Teaching Building (Yifu Building), Gymnastics-Art Integrated Building and the Science Building (科学馆). General programming construction was completed in 2002, and at the same time the school systematically revamped the teaching equipment, experimental apparatus and basic facilities. The GA Integrated Building was built in 2005. It has 34 so-called Special Classrooms, including Telecasting Room, Learning Room, Room of Celestial Phenomena and Computer Rooms. School buildings also contain auditoriums, a studio and Chamber for Academic Report used for conferences. In addition, there is a plastic field underground and overground (for basketball and track and field), a basketball gymnasium and rooms for fine arts and music education. 

                
The school administration had been highly concerned about the audiovisual means conducive to multimedia education. In 2007, the school leadership invited tenders. Eventually, it chose Anliang Technology Co., Ltd (安良科技公司) for the operation of the multimedia installment around every corner in the school. All the classrooms were fit with computer systems and projectors. The computers are embedded in the platform desks and are linked to the entire school's networks. Bidirectional closed-circuit television (CCTV) system is available. As every classroom is accessible to Internet, it has proved to be very convenient when such demand exists during some classes. The school has operated its own campus website since 2005, on which it can release campus news and issue circulars to the public.

The Science Building (sometimes referred to as the Experiment Building), built in 1989, is the oldest existing building still in use at present. It contains the school library, laboratories, the biological specimen room and computer rooms. From July to August 2007, the Science Building was extensively renovated, with a budget of 1,760,000 yuan. With a variety of experimental instruments in the Science Building, the school is capable of fulfilling all required experimental curricula in physics, chemistry and biology. It has procured many latest and advanced instruments, such as new-styled microscopes, EMD timers, and multitesters.

In 2017, the school moved to the Green-Valley Campus(绿谷校区). With an investment of more than 551 million yuan, the new campus covers an area of 14.5547 hectares and contains two Teaching Buildings, two Science Buildings(with three floors of Library), one Office Building, one Art Building, one Astronomy-Music Integrated Building, one Stadium, three Dormitory Buildings, one Standard Soccer Field, and one Dining Hall Building.

Library 

The school library is set in the Science Building and has over 90,000 books in store, offering thousands of magazines and newspapers in nearly 520 kinds. The former school library was the oldest high school library in Xinjiang. According to the school chronicles, the library had 5,641 books in 1931, making one of the most famous in the province (Xinjiang was formerly a province during ROC period). In 1966, the number of stored books turned 40,000; however, the Cultural Revolution (1966–1976) made an end to it, all its stored books having been looted.

In the late 1970s, the library was reestablished and underwent massive development during the 1980s. The present school library was built in 1989. The library currently occupies 802.12 m2 in area, with 195 seats in the reading room, available for 2 classes at the same time. It provides Senior 3 students with a room for individual study. Three librarians are in charge of the library.

The General Library Integrated System was adopted and put into service in September 2004. The library opens to all students during school time, and periodically, different classes commence their reading lessons in the library's reading room. Every student in the school has been given a bar-coded card for borrowing books, able to be recognized by computer. The school authorities spent 80,000 yuan annually for the library on the purchase of approximately 2,000 books, 60 kinds of newspapers and copies of magazines in 500 kinds.

Daily maintenance

In order to lighten the burden on students in daily maintenance and to enhance security of the whole campus, the school employed a group of cleaners as well as security guards from Xinjiang Baihuacun Estate Management Company Limited (新疆百花村物业有限公司) in 2004, making it one of the few schools with such high campus life standards. The act is believed to reduce the labor intensity of students, whose de facto sanitary work is thus limited within the classrooms. School cleaners are responsible for the whole school except internal classrooms (public classrooms and auditoria excluded).

School administration
The administrative group of the No. 1 Senior High School of Urumqi is divided into General Office, Pedagogy Office, Teaching and Research Office, Student Office, General Affairs Office and Financial Office. Each office is normally in the charge of a director and a vice-director. The offices are mainly located in the Teaching Building and the Gymnastics-Art Integrated Building.

School leadership

Principal Luo Qunyan
Vice-PrincipalYan Jingxia
Gao Yueqing
CPC General Branch Secretary  Gao Ximei

Teachers and staff

The No. 1 Senior High School, with a group of high-qualified teachers, teaches to cultivate all-around students. The school has 8 (de facto 4 at present) special-class teachers and 77 high-class teachers. Many of them give lessons and coach students in curricula for the College Entrance Exams and for the national academic contests. The school has already raised the standard of employment, employing personnel with master's degrees or higher qualifications. English teachers are routinely sent abroad to attend further studies.
	
Averagely 20 theses by the school teachers are issued on the national publications, and their authors regularly win prizes every year. In addition, it is estimated that around 15 incumbent teachers are affiliated to different local academic associations, which are at the city level and the province level (autonomous region level). Some of these teachers undertake association assignments, or permanently assume office in the associations, such as Urumqi Chemistry Society, Xinjiang Physics Society, and Xinjiang Education Association.

Teaching and Research Groups
The Chinese Teaching and Research Group: consisting of Chinese teachers in all three grades
The Mathematics Teaching and Research Group: consisting of Mathematics teachers in all three grades, some of whom are also coaches of Mathematics contests
The English Teaching and Research Group: consisting of English teachers in all three grades
The Physics Teaching and Research Group: consisting of Physics teachers in Senior Grade 1 and Natural-Sciences classes of Senior Grade 2 and 3, some of whom are also coaches of Physics contests
The Chemistry Teaching and Research Group: consisting of Chemistry teachers in Senior Grade 1 and Natural-Sciences classes of Senior Grade 2 and 3, some of whom are also coaches of Chemistry contests
The Biology Teaching and Research Group: consisting of Biology teachers in Senior Grade 2 and Natural-Sciences classes of Senior Grade 3, some of whom are also coaches of Biology contests
The Politics Teaching and Research Group: consisting of Politics teachers in Senior Grade 1, 2 and Social-Sciences classes of Senior Grade 3
The History Teaching and Research Group: consisting of History teachers in Senior Grade 1 and Social-Sciences classes of Senior Grade 2 and 3
The Geography Teaching and Research Group: consisting of Geography teachers in Senior Grade 1 and Social-Sciences classes of Senior Grade 2 and 3
The Physical Education, Music & Fine Arts Teaching and Research Group: consisting of PE teachers in all three grades, Music teachers in Senior Grade 1 and Fine arts teachers in Senior Grade 2
The Information Technology Teaching and Research Group: consisting of Information technology teachers in Senior Grade 1 and General technology teachers in Senior Grade 2, some of whom are also coaches of Informatics contests
The Mental Health Teaching and Research Group: consisting of Mental health teachers in Senior Grade 1 and 2

Class Teachers

Senior Grade 1:
normal classes: Chinese, Mathematics, English, Physics, Chemistry, Politics, History or Geography teacher
Natural-Scientific Strong-point Classes: Chinese, Mathematics, English, Physics or Chemistry teacher
Senior Grade 2 and 3:
Social-Sciences classes (including Social-Scientific Strong-point Classes): Chinese, Mathematics, English, Politics, History or Geography teacher
Natural-Sciences classes (including Natural-Scientific Strong-point Classes): Chinese, Mathematics, English, Physics, Chemistry or Biology teacher

Students

The school mainly enrolls junior middle school graduates of junior high schools in Urumqi, and a few excellent students from the other parts in the Xinjiang Uyghur Autonomous Region. The top students who passed its self-standardized difficult natural-science-oriented tests (including Chinese, mathematics, English, physics and Chemistry) will form several Natural-Scientific Strong-point Classes (理科特长班). At the end of Senior Grade 1, students who choose Social Sciences will have social-science-oriented tests (including Politics, History and Geography). The top students will form the Social-Scientific Strong-point Classes (文科特长班). Other students who are not adept at studies but have conspicuous abilities in athletics, basketball or fine arts can be also admissible if they pass the selective tests.

Statistics indicates that the school ranked 6th in 2006, and 2nd in 2008 on a nationwide ranking list by number of the number-one scholars graduates in the College Entrance Examination (CEE) every year. As of 2008, it had totally developed 10 number-one scholar graduates.

In 2007, 31 students of the 2007 graduates of the No. 1 Senior High School are set to be exempted from standardized exams, or to be admitted 10 or 20 scores lower than the standard to different universities, 13 among whom passed the assessments conducted by the universities, known as the Independent Recruitment Tests. In 2008, 53 students of the to-be-graduates acquired the same privileges.

Curricula
The school provides three types of curricula: basic curricula, outreach curricula (electives) and practice curricula, though it is still a constitutionally CEE/contest-centered school similar to most other ordinary and key senior high schools in China. Coaching for contests is commonly carried out in the Natural-Scientific Strong-point Classes, as these classes are specially set to major in the academic contests in the first two school years.

Basic curricula
Students in Xinjiang use the Nationwide Exam Papers II in CEE, but the listening scores of English are not reckoned in the total scores of CEE, and the scores of other English questions multiply 1.25 in CEE.

extra classes

There are extra classes on weekends (normally Saturdays) and in holidays.
Senior Grade 1: the subjects in Natural-Sciences CEE (except Biology, which is not studied in Senior Grade 1), 40 minutes per class
Senior Grade 2: six subjects in CEE, 40 minutes per class
Senior Grade 3: six subjects in CEE, 80 minutes per class in the morning, 40 minutes per class in the afternoon

Electives

For contests (e.g., High School Academic Contests)

Natural-Sciences contests:
Mathematics
Chemistry
Physics
Biology
other contests:
Informatics
Robotics
Visual Basic (VB)
Chinese
English

For hobbies (titles of the groups)

 Chinese literature society
 Astronomy group
 Fine Arts group
 Basketball team
 Track and field team
 Calisthenics team
 Photography club
 Music group

Practice
 Community service
 Social practice
 Association activities
 Activities of technological innovations
 Creation of Class Culture

Activities

 Morning Gathering (晨会) is a plenary assembly held at 9:00 a.m. every Monday (during school terms) on the playground, lasting for near 20 minutes. The weekly on-duty class hosts the gathering, responsible for a flag-raising ceremony, a speech to the flag (国旗献词), sometimes a summary of the school's performance in terms of discipline for the past one week (上周值周总结), and more optional procedures, such as lectures by teachers on certain topics.
 Sports Day (运动会) is held every year, lasting for two or three days in late September or early October, including mostly track and field events. All students of three grades are bound to participate in the events. The 2005 Games were cancelled due to the 50th Anniversary of the Xinjiang Uyghur Autonomous Region. The 2017 Games were also cancelled.
Basketball Games are held annually in March and April, involving only Senior 1 and Senior 2 team members, since the Senior 3 students are busy with academic preparations for the CEE.
 Military training is an indispensable yearly drill for the newly recruited new grade (senior) 1 students, taking place in August before their first term in a local military base (barracks) or at school. All the students are required to live in the military base or at school during the military training.
 Poem recitation contest
 Callisthenic exercises contest (广播操比赛)
 Joint performance on New Year's Day (元旦汇演)
 Growing-up ceremony (成人仪式)

Student organizations

 Student Union (学生会), made up of students, is responsible for school affairs and activities. It is established through the yearly Student Congress (学生代表大会), and consists of Life Department, Study Department and Propaganda Department.
Student's Union (December 2011-December 2012)
 President of Student's Union: Zhang Rongrong (张容榕), vice president of Student's Union: Yin Ruizhe (尹锐哲) and Jiang Bowen (姜博文).
 CYLC committee (团委), made up of teachers and students, is established annually via CYLC Member Congress (团员代表大会).
 CYLC branches (团支部) are set in every class pertinent to the League members (mostly the students). Every class has an elected student as the secretary of the branch (团支部书记)
 Astronomy group (乌鲁木齐市第一中学天文小组 ) routinely recruits students with enthusiasms about astronomy or astrophotography. It has conducted large number of astronomical observations. The group is headed by Gao Xing (高兴), a physics teacher and astronomy amateur who discovered several celestial bodies. This astronomy group is popular on the Internet, and plays an active part within the school. The current school's astronomy group, founded in 1998 (the initial one founded in the 1950s was intermitted by the Cultural Revolution), was set to typically aim for observation activities for affiliated students (it was also once disbanded in 2002, but later reestablished), and has accomplished many astronomical observation programs.

Endowment

Though a public school, the No. 1 Senior High School has received plenty of endowments of mainly educational instruments and others. Sir Run Run Shaw (邵逸夫), a Hong Kong media mogul and philanthropist, donated a building (presently as the main building) in 2001.

It was also endowed with many teaching and experimental instruments, such as desks, chairs, microscopes, vernier calipers, and multitesters from the Official Development Assistance Japan. This was the sequence to the Japan's 3rd Program of Secondary Education Equipment for Minority Areas in the People's Republic of China (第三次少数民族地区中学教育器材装备计划) launched by ODA Japan in 1999; the No. 1 Senior High School was one of those to have been endowed, while the equipment was put into service in 2000.

Events
On April 22, 2003, the Academy of Arts and Design, Tsinghua University officially granted the No. 1 Senior High School of Urumqi the nominal brass plate, making it one of its students resources base schools.
Hundreds of selected schoolgirls of both Senior 1 and 2 of the No. 1 Senior High School attended the performance on the 50th Anniversary of the Xinjiang Uyghur Autonomous Region on October 1, 2005.
During the One hundred academicians’ (experts’) visits to one hundred schools (百名院士(专家)进百校 ) in August 2005, Chen Ning Yang, the 1957 Nobel Prize recipient, paid a visit to the No. 1 Senior High School of Urumqi, along with several other CAS academicians who later lectured at the school.
Jocelyn Bell Burnell, Northern Irish astrophysicist who discovered the first radio pulsar, lectured on Seeking the Universe and answered to the questions the students had asked.

Partnerships
The No. 1 Senior High School is base school that provide candidates for the following cooperative colleges or universities:

Academy of Arts and Design, Tsinghua University (清华大学美术学院)
National University of Defense Technology (国防科技大学)
Wuhan University (武汉大学)
Harbin Institute of Technology (哈尔滨工业大学)

Sister schools
 Osaka Prefectural Moriguchi Higashi High School
 Chengdu No.7 High School (成都市第七中学)
 High School attached to Tsinghua University (清华大学附属中学)
 Harbin No.3 Middle School (哈尔滨市第三中学)
 Private Nanshan Senior High School

Courses

Chinese
use the textbooks and Chinese Reading Books 3 and 4 from People's Education Press.
Compulsory Course 1
Compulsory Course 2
Compulsory Course 3
Compulsory Course 4
Compulsory Course 5
Elective Course (Appreciation of Ancient Chinese Poetry and Prose)
Elective Course (Study of Chinese Cultural Classics)
Elective Course (Appreciation of Chinese Novels)

Mathematics
use the textbooks of version A from People's Education Press.
Compulsory Course 1
Compulsory Course 2
Compulsory Course 3
Compulsory Course 4
Compulsory Course 5
Elective Course 1-1 (for Social Sciences)
Elective Course 1-2 (for Social Sciences)
Elective Course 2-1 (for Natural Sciences)
Elective Course 2-2 (for Natural Sciences)
Elective Course 2-3 (for Natural Sciences)
Elective Course 4-4 (Coordinate System and Parameter Equation)
Elective Course 4-5 (Selection of Inequalities)

English
use the textbooks from People's Education Press, the textbooks for the compulsory courses each contain two CDs from People's Education Electronic & Audiovisual Press.
Compulsory Course 1
Compulsory Course 2
Compulsory Course 3
Compulsory Course 4
Compulsory Course 5
Elective Course 6
Elective Course 7
Elective Course 8
Elective Course 9
Elective Course 10

Physics
use the textbooks from People's Education Press.
Compulsory Course 1
Compulsory Course 2
Elective Course 3-1
Elective Course 3-2 (for Natural Sciences)
Elective Course 3-3 (for Natural Sciences)
Elective Course 3-4 (for Natural Sciences)
Elective Course 3-5 (for Natural Sciences)

Chemistry
use the textbooks from People's Education Press.
Compulsory Course 1
Compulsory Course 2
Elective Course 1 (Chemistry and Life)
Elective Course 3 (Material Structure and Properties) (for Natural Sciences)
Elective Course 4 (Chemical Reaction Principle) (for Natural Sciences)
Elective Course 5 (Fundamentals of Organic Chemistry) (for Natural Sciences)

Biology
use the textbooks and the experiment report books( for compulsory courses ) from People's Education Press.
Compulsory Course 1 (Molecules and Cells)
Compulsory Course 2 (Heredity and Evolution)
Compulsory Course 3 (Homeostasis and Environment)
Elective Course 1 (Biotechnology Practice) (for Natural Sciences)
Elective Course 3 (Modern Biotechnology Topics) (for Natural Sciences)

Politics
use the textbooks from People's Education Press.
Compulsory Course 1 (Economic Life)
Compulsory Course 2 (Political Life)
Compulsory Course 3 (Cultural Life)
Compulsory Course 4 (Life and Philosophy)
national unity (use the textbook from Xinjiang Education Publishing House)(removed in 2019)

History
use the textbooks from People's Education Press.
Compulsory Course 1
Compulsory Course 2
Compulsory Course 3
Elective Course 1 (Review of Major Reforms in History) (for Social Sciences)
Elective Course 3 (War and Peace in Twentieth Century) (for Social Sciences)
Elective Course 4 (Commentary on Historical Figures at Home and Abroad) (for Social Sciences)

Geography
use the textbooks from People's Education Press.
Compulsory Course 1
Compulsory Course 2
Compulsory Course 3
Elective Course 3 (Tourism Geography) (for Social Sciences)
Elective Course 6 (Environmental Protection) (for Social Sciences)

Information technology
use the textbooks from Educational Science Publishing House, the textbook for the compulsory course contains a CD.
Compulsory Course (Information Technology Foundation)
Elective Course 1 (Algorithm and Program Design)

General technology
use the textbooks from Jiangsu Education Publishing House, the textbooks each contain a CD.
Compulsory Course 1 (Technology and Design 1)
Compulsory Course 2 (Technology and Design 2)

Physical education
Students of the same sex from two classes have PE classes together. Students of different sexes have different contents in PE classes.

Music
use the textbook from People's Music Publishing House
Compulsory Course (Music Appreciation)

Fine arts
use the textbook from People's Fine Arts Publishing House
Fine Arts Appreciation

Mental health
use the "Health" textbooks from Tuanjie Press, but the teaching contents are not limited to the textbooks.

Inquiry-based learning
Students have to complete three projects.

Exams

monthly exams and final exams
In Senior Grade 1 and 2, every term there are two monthly exams and a final exam. In the first term of Senior Grade 3, there are three monthly exams.
In Senior Grade 1, the subjects in Natural-Sciences CEE (except Biology, which is not studied in Senior Grade 1) are always tested and reckoned in the total scores in each exam, while the subjects only in Social-Sciences CEE are not always tested and not reckoned in the total scores.
In Senior Grade 2 and 3, six subjects in CEE are always tested and reckoned in the total scores in each exam, while in Senior Grade 2 the subjects not in CEE (Politics for Natural-Sciences and Biology for Social-Sciences) are easier, and they are not always tested and not reckoned in the total scores.
In Senior Grade 2 and 3, Mathematics tests for Social-Sciences are easier than those for Natural-Sciences. This is because Social-Sciences students study fewer contents and have easier test in CEE.
In Senior Grade 2 and the second term of Senior Grade 1, students in Natural-Scientific Strong-point Classes have harder Physics tests.

simulation exams

the first simulation exam of Urumqi
Natural-Sciences:
Chinese (150 scores, 150 minutes): the exam scope of CEE
harder Mathematics (150 scores, 120 minutes): the exam scope of CEE
English (150 scores, 120 minutes): the exam scope of CEE
Physics (100 scores, 100 minutes): the two Compulsory Courses, Elective Course 3-1, Elective Course 3-5, all of them are a part of the compulsory exam scope of CEE
Chemistry (100 scores, 100 minutes): the compulsory exam scope of CEE
Biology (100 scores, 100 minutes): the compulsory exam scope of CEE (the three Compulsory Courses)
Social-Sciences:
Chinese (150 scores, 150 minutes): the exam scope of CEE
easier Mathematics (150 scores, 120 minutes): the exam scope of CEE
English (150 scores, 120 minutes): the exam scope of CEE
Politics (100 scores, 100 minutes): the four Compulsory Courses
History (100 scores, 100 minutes): the compulsory exam scope of CEE (the three Compulsory Courses)
Geography (100 scores, 100 minutes): the compulsory exam scope of CEE (the three Compulsory Courses and Geography in junior high school)

the other simulation exams
The exam scope of all the subjects is according to CEE.

Natural-Sciences:
Chinese (150 scores, 150 minutes)
harder Mathematics (150 scores, 120 minutes)
Comprehensive Natural Sciences (300 scores [110 for Physics, 100 for Chemistry, 90 for Biology], 150 minutes)
English (150 scores, 120 minutes)
Social-Sciences:
Chinese (150 scores, 150 minutes)
easier Mathematics (150 scores, 120 minutes)
Comprehensive Social Sciences (300 scores [100 for each of Politics, History and Geography], 150 minutes)
English (150 scores, 120 minutes)

the Qualifying Exam of the Academic Proficiency Examination
The exam scope of the Qualifying Exam of the Academic Proficiency Examination in Xinjiang contains all the compulsory courses of the tested subjects, some elective courses of Physics, Chemistry and Information technology, current Politics and national unity for Xinjiang(removed in 2019).

the second term of Senior Grade 1:
Physics (90 minutes)
Chemistry (90 minutes)
History (90 minutes)
Geography (90 minutes)
national unity education (90 minutes)(removed in 2019)
Information technology (60 minutes, tested in the computer room)
the first term of Senior Grade 2:
Chinese (120 minutes)
Mathematics (120 minutes)
English (120 minutes)
the second term of Senior Grade 2:
experiment (Physics, Chemistry, Biology, General technology)
Biology (90 minutes)
Politics (90 minutes)
General technology (90 minutes)

other exams
Students also have other exams, such as weekly exams in Senior Grade 3.

weekly exams

the first term
Monday and Tuesday: other three CEE subjects (every two weeks for each subject)
Wednesday: Mathematics (every week)
Thursday: English or Chinese (every two weeks for each subject)

the second term
Tuesday: comprehensive subjects (every week)
Wednesday: Mathematics (every week)
Thursday: English or Chinese (every two weeks for each subject)
Friday: comprehensive subjects (every two weeks)

See also

 Asteroid 546845 Wulumuqiyizhong, named in honor of the school
 Gao Xing
 Ürümqi

References
 乌鲁木齐市中考招生指南 (Urumqi Municipal Bureau of Education)
 乌鲁木齐市第一中学校史

Footnotes

External links
 Official Website 
 百度贴吧_乌鲁木齐一中吧 
 乌鲁木齐市第一中学天文小组论坛 

U
Education in Ürümqi
Educational institutions established in 1891
1891 establishments in China